The 2016 Pinstripe Bowl was a post-season American college football bowl game played on December 28, 2016 at Yankee Stadium in the New York City borough of the Bronx. The seventh edition of the Pinstripe Bowl featured the Pittsburgh Panthers of the Atlantic Coast Conference against the Northwestern Wildcats of the Big Ten Conference. It was one of the 2016–17 bowl games that concluded the 2016 FBS football season. Sponsored by the New Era Cap Company, the game was officially known as the New Era Pinstripe Bowl.

Teams selected
The game featured conference tie-ins from the Atlantic Coast Conference and the Big Ten Conference.

This was the seventh meeting between the schools, with the series previously tied at 3–3. The previous meeting of the two teams was on September 29, 1973, where the Panthers defeated the Wildcats by a score of 21–14.

Pittsburgh Panthers

Northwestern Wildcats

Game summary

Box score

Scoring summary

Source:

Statistics

Source:

Source:

References

External links
 Box score at ESPN

Pinstripe Bowl
Pinstripe Bowl
Northwestern Wildcats football bowl games
Pittsburgh Panthers football bowl games
Pinstripe Bowl
Pinstripe Bowl
2010s in the Bronx